Pleurobranchus grandis is a species of sidegill slug, a marine gastropod mollusc in the family Pleurobranchidae. Also known as Cuban dancer.

References

External links

 

Pleurobranchidae
Gastropods described in 1868